Elephant Micah and the Palmyra Palm is  CD-R released by Elephant Micah. It contains material from the same sessions that would produce Elephant Micah and the Loud Guitars and Elephant Micah and the Agrarian Malaise. Released on Time-Lag Records in May, 2004.

Track listing
"The Paranoia"
"Daniel's Song"
"The Greatest Claim"
"Girls Are Homely"
"A Stylish Way"
"Technology"
"It's Music"
"The Poison"
"Fifteen or Five"
"Mercy On Us"
"(The Night I Dropped) My Plastic Amplifier"
"Be My Bright Light"

Elephant Micah albums
2004 albums